HIP 12961 is a star with an exoplanetary companion in the equatorial constellation of Eridanus. It is too faint to be visible to the naked eye, with an apparent visual magnitude of 10.24. The distance to this system can be estimated from its parallax measurements, which yield a separation of 76.3 light-years from the Sun.

This was classified as a cool red dwarf star of stellar classification M0 in 1980, while C. B. Stephenson graded it as class K5V in 1986. The absolute magnitude and color index of this star is a closer match to the former. It shows a high chromospheric activity level 
and is one of the largest and brightest M class red dwarf stars known, with 64% of the mass and 63% of the radius of the Sun. The star is radiating 10% of the luminosity of the Sun from its photosphere at an effective temperature of 4,092 K.

HIP 12961 is named Koeia. The name was selected in the NameExoWorlds campaign by Puerto Rico, during the 100th anniversary of the IAU. Koeia was the word for star in the language of the Taíno Indigenous People of the Caribbean.

Planetary system
HIP 12961 b is an extrasolar planet that was announced in a press release in October 2009.. This planet has at least half the mass of Jupiter and takes over eight weeks to orbit the host star at a separation of 0.25 AU and an eccentricity (ovalness) of 0.17. The planet is named Aumatex. Aumatex was the god of wind in the mythology of the Taíno Indigenous People of the Caribbean. The names were chosen by the Society of Women in Space Exploration- UPR-Humacao Chapter.

References

K-type main-sequence stars
M-type main-sequence stars
Planetary systems with one confirmed planet

Eridanus (constellation)
Durchmusterung objects
012961